Turan Amirsoleimani (born Qamar ol-Molouk Amirsoleimani,; 4 February 1905 – 24 July 1995) was an Iranian royal and the third wife of Reza Shah, with whom she had a son named Gholam Reza Pahlavi.

Biography
Turan was born Qamar ol-Molouk Amirsoleimani in 1905. Her father, Isa Khan Majd es-Saltaneh, was a son of Majd ed-Dowleh (a first cousin of Naser al-Din Shah Qajar).

She continued her education until earning her diploma from Namous High School in Tehran. In 1922, she married Reza Khan, who was the minister of war at the time. The following year she gave birth to her only son, Gholam Reza Pahlavi. The couple divorced shortly afterwards. The reason for it was that Reza Khan considered her to have an arrogant personality. 

After divorce, Amirsoleimani refrained from remarrying and lived with her son Gholam Reza in one of the royal residences. In 1945, a year after Reza Shah's death, she married Zabihollah Malekpour, a renowned merchant. Tadj ol-Molouk, Reza Shah's widow and the Queen Mother, used this marriage as an excuse to force Amirsoleimani out of the residence given to her by her former husband.

Following the Iranian Revolution in 1979, Amirsoleimani left Iran and moved to Germany before being moved to a retirement home in Paris in her later years. She died there on 24 July 1995 and was buried at the cimetière parisien de Thiais. Her son was buried next to her after his death in 2017.

Amirsoleimani's house in Iran was located on the southwest side of the intersection of Pesyan and Ismaili in the Zafaraniyeh neighbourhood of Tehran. This property was partially destroyed by the Imam Khomeini Relief Foundation on 19 July 2016 before being sold to a private owner and demolished completely.

References

20th-century Iranian women
1905 births
1995 deaths
People from Tehran
Qajar princesses
Spouses of prime ministers of Iran
Wives of Reza Shah
Exiles of the Iranian Revolution in Germany
Exiles of the Iranian Revolution in France